The Pirogue is a 2012 Senegalese drama film directed by Moussa Toure. The film competed in the Un Certain Regard section at the 2012 Cannes Film Festival.

Cast
 Bassirou Diakhate
 Moctar Diop

References

External links
 

2012 films
2012 drama films
2010s French-language films
Best French-Language Film Lumières Award winners
Senegalese drama films